Montaluce Winery & Estates was established as a winery-based community in Dahlonega, Georgia,  north of Atlanta in 2007 by a partnership between Atlanta-based Beecham Builders, Greenway Development and Harrison Design Associates and featured Tuscan-styled architecture. Lots began at $70,000 and homes at $370,000 with a goal to finish the 400 acre project within five to six years. However, the project suffered from the economic fallout of the Great Recession and it went up for auction in 2014.

It currently operates as Montaluce Winery & Restaurant and offers villas from the prior community for rent.

References

External links
 

Wineries in Georgia (U.S. state)
Restaurants in Georgia (U.S. state)